Battle of Yashima (屋島の戦い) was one of the battles of the Genpei War on March 22, 1185, in the Heian period. It occurred in Sanuki Province (Shikoku), which is now Takamatsu, Kagawa.

Background
Following a long string of defeats, the Taira clan retreated to Yashima, today's Takamatsu, just off the coast of Shikoku. Here they had a fortress, and an improvised palace for Emperor Antoku and the imperial regalia, which they had taken earlier in the war.

Battle 
On the 18th, a Minamoto force tried to cross the sea but many of the boats were damaged in a storm.  Kajiwara Kagetoki then suggested adding "reverse oars" to the boats, which prompted an argument from Minamoto no Yoshitsune.  Finally after the boats were repaired and despite the high winds, Yoshitsune departed with only five of the 200 boats carrying about 150 of his men.  After arriving in Tsubaki Bay, in Awa Province.  Yoshitsune then advanced into Sanuki Province through the night reaching the bay with the Imperial Palace at Yashima, and the houses in Mure and Takamatsu.

The Taira were expecting a naval attack, and so Yoshitsune lit bonfires on Shikoku, essentially in their rear, fooling the Taira into believing that a large force was approaching on land. They abandoned their palace, and took to their ships, along with Emperor Antoku and the imperial regalia.

In a memorable account in the Heike monogatari, a "very beautiful lady" in a Heike boat, placed a fan atop a pole, and dared the Minamoto to knock it off. In one of the most famous archery feats in all of Japanese history, Nasu no Yoichi rode out into the sea on horseback, and did just that in one shot. The Minamoto were victorious, but the majority of the Taira fleet escaped to Dan-no-ura, where they were defeated one month later in the Battle of Dan-no-ura.

Gallery

See also 
 Satō Tsugunobu
 The Tale of Heike

References

1180s in Japan
1185 in Asia
Yashima 1185
Yashima